The Greens or Greens may refer to:

Current political parties
Australian Greens, also known as The Greens
Greens of Andorra
Greens of Bosnia and Herzegovina
Greens of Burkina
Greens (Greece)
Greens of Montenegro
Greens of Serbia
Greens of Slovenia
The Greens (Benin)
The Greens (Bulgaria)
The Greens (Denmark)
Green League (Finland), also known as The Greens
The Greens (Israel)
The Greens (Luxembourg)
The Greens (Mauritius)
The Greens (Netherlands)
The Greens (Poland)

Greens (South Tyrol)

Historical political parties
The Greens (France)
 The Greens, a political faction and associated chariot-racing team in the Byzantine empire; involved in the deadly Nika riots of 532

Political parties or groups with similar titles
Alliance 90/The Greens, Germany
Confederation of the Greens, Spain
Ecologist Party "The Greens", Portugal
Europe Ecology – The Greens, France
Federation of the Greens, Italy
Greens–European Free Alliance, in the European Parliament
The Greens – The Green Alternative, Austria

Sports teams 
Maccabi Haifa F.C., nicknamed The Greens.

See also
Greens (disambiguation)
Green politics
Green Party (disambiguation)
Die Grünen (disambiguation)
Green Party of Aotearoa New Zealand
Green Party of England and Wales
Green Party (Ireland)
Green Party of the United States
Les Verts (disambiguation)
The Green (disambiguation)